Great Western Railway heritage sites are those places where stations, bridges and other infrastructure built by the Great Western Railway and its constituent railways can still be found.  These may be heritage railways, museums, operational railway stations, or isolated listed structures.

Operational GWR style heritage railways 
These heritage railways operate on old GWR branch lines.  Many other heritage railways and museums also have GWR locomotives or rolling stock in use or on display.

 Bodmin & Wenford Railway – Bodmin General to Boscarne Junction and Bodmin Parkway (formerly Bodmin Road), Cornwall
 Chinnor & Princes Risborough Railway – Chinnor, Oxfordshire to Princes Risborough, Buckinghamshire
 Cholsey & Wallingford Railway – Cholsey to Wallingford, Oxfordshire
 Dean Forest Railway – Lydney to Parkend, Gloucestershire
 Didcot Railway Centre, Oxfordshire
 East Somerset Railway, Cranmore, Somerset
 Gwili Railway – Bronwydd Arms to Llwyfan Cerrig, Carmarthenshire
 Llangollen Railway – Llangollen to Carrog
 Dartmouth Steam Railway – Paignton to Kingswear, Devon
 Plym Valley Railway – Marsh Mills, Devon
 Severn Valley Railway – Kidderminster to Bridgnorth, Worcestershire and Shropshire
 South Devon Railway – Totnes to Buckfastleigh, Devon
 Swindon and Cricklade Railway – Blunsdon, Gloucestershire
 West Somerset Railway – Bishops Lydeard to Minehead, Somerset

Museums
These museums have a GWR theme or are located in old GWR buildings.

 Buckfastleigh Railway Museum, Devon
 Coleford Great Western Railway Museum, Gloucestershire
 Didcot Railway Centre, Oxfordshire
 Kidderminster railway museum, Worcestershire
 Newton Abbot Town and GWR Museum, Devon
 STEAM – the museum of the GWR, Swindon, Wiltshire (in the old Swindon railway works)

Listed structures

In addition to the places listed below, there are a great many smaller bridges and other structures that have been given listed status. The listing may only cover certain buildings and structures at each location.

World Heritage Site
UNESCO is considering a proposal to list the Great Western Main Line as a World Heritage Site.  The proposal comprises seven individual sites.  These are Bristol Temple Meads railway station (including Brunel's Company Offices, Boardroom, train shed, and the Bristol and Exeter Railway Offices along with the route over the River Avon); Bath Spa railway station along with the line from Twerton Tunnel to the Sydney Gardens, Middlehill and Box Tunnels; the Swindon area including Swindon railway works and village; Maidenhead Railway Bridge; Wharncliffe Viaduct; and London Paddington station.

Grade I listed
 Avon Bridge, Bristol
 Bristol Temple Meads railway station
 London Paddington station
 Maidenhead Railway Bridge, Berkshire
 Royal Albert Bridge, Saltash, Cornwall
 Starcross pumping house, Devon

Grade II* listed
 Bath Spa railway station, Somerset
 Box Tunnel, Wiltshire
 Bridgwater railway station, Somerset
 Bristol & Exeter Railway Headquarters, Temple Meads, Bristol
 Chippenham viaduct, Wiltshire
 Maidenhead Railway Bridge, Buckinghamshire
 Moorswater Viaduct, Liskeard, Cornwall
 Mortimer railway station, Berkshire
 Parrett Bridge, Bridgwater, Somerset
 Swindon railway works, Wiltshire (some buildings listed Grade II)
 Windsor Railway Bridge, Berkshire
 Worcester Shrub Hill railway station, Worcestershire

Grade II listed
 Ashburton goods shed, Devon
 Bovey railway station, Devon
 Bradford-on-Avon railway station, Wiltshire
 Chippenham railway station, Wiltshire
 Dawlish railway station, Devon
 Devil's Bridge, Bleadon, Somerset
 Exeter goods transfer shed, Devon
 Exeter St Thomas railway station, Devon
 Exminster railway station, Devon
 Frome railway station, Somerset
 Gatehampton Railway Bridge, Goring, Berkshire
 Hele and Bradninch goods shed, Devon
Leamington Spa railway station, Warwickshire 
 Maiden Newton railway station, Dorset
 Minehead railway station, Somerset
 Moulsford Railway Bridge, Oxfordshire
 Penzance railway station, Cornwall
 Reading railway station, Berkshire
 Redruth railway station, Cornwall
 St Austell railway station, Cornwall
 St Erth railway station, Cornwall
 Salisbury goods shed, Wiltshire
 Sandford and Banwell railway station, Somerset
 Slough railway station, Berkshire
 Stoke Canon signal box, Devon
 Taunton railway station, Somerset
 Torquay railway station, Devon
 Torre railway station, Devon
 Tregenna Castle Hotel, St Ives, Cornwall
 Wells goods shed, Somerset
 Weston-super-Mare signal box, Somerset
 Williton railway station, Somerset
 Windsor and Eton Central railway station, Berkshire
 Yatton railway station, Somerset

See also

 List of British heritage and private railways
 List of railway museums in the United Kingdom
 National Railway Museum, York

References

Heritage sites
Great Western Railway heritage sites